Edward Bayntun may refer to:

 Edward Bayntun (1480–1544), English courtier
 Edward Bayntun (died 1593) (1517–1593), English MP
 Sir Edward Bayntun (died 1657), (1593–1657), English MP
 Sir Edward Bayntun (died 1679), (1618–1679), English MP
 Edward Bayntun (died 1720), English MP for Calne 1705–1710